Amanora Park Town is a residential township project in Hadapsar, Pune. The project is developed by the City Corporation Limited. 

The township project comes under the Government of Maharashtra's special township policy.

Amanora Chambers, a juncture for multiple start-ups and offices, is a part of Amanora township.

Food
Bhooj Adda

References

 
 Amanora Gateway Towers 1 flats at Pune - Economic Times
 Amanora Town Centre awarded
 Amanora Park Town plans sports & education centre
 Amanora Projects
 Aniruddha Deshpande

Neighbourhoods in Pune
Townships in India